Miss Earth 2004, the 4th edition of the Miss Earth pageant, was held on October 24, 2004 at the University of the Philippines Theater in Diliman, Quezon City, Philippines. Dania Prince of Honduras crowned her successor Priscilla Meirelles of Brazil at the end of the event.

The 21-year-old medical student from Brazil, Priscilla Meirelles, who stands 5’ 8" and has a 35"-24"-35" figure, won the coveted title, and with her win, Brazil became the first country in history to win in all of the Big Four international beauty pageants, namely Miss Universe, Miss World, Miss International and Miss Earth.

Miss Martinique Murielle Celimene was crowned Miss Air, the pageant’s equivalent to first runner-up. Miss Water and Miss Fire (second and third runners-up, respectively) — were won by Miss Tahiti Kahaya Lusazh (English name: Stephanie Lesage) and Miss Paraguay Yanina Gonzalez.

The winners were chosen by the 11-person board of judges who included last year’s Miss Earth’s Beauty for a Cause awardee, Vida Samadzai, Noel Lorenzana of Unilever Philippines, Stefan Voogel of InterContinental Manila, Kit Ti LIan of Avon Color, Lorraine Timbol of Media Arts Systems and Services Co., Regina Paz Lopez of ABS-CBN Foundation, Chin Chin Gutierrez, actress and staunch advocate of environmental concerns, international singer-actor Leo Valdez, Deborah Landey of the United Nations Development Programme, Freddie Garcia of ABS-CBN, and Department of Trade and Industry Secretary Cesar Purisima.

Results

Placements

Special awards

Order of announcements

Top 16

Top 8

Top 4

Judges

Contestants
List of countries and delegates that participated in Miss Earth 2004:

  - Vilma Masha
  - Daniela Puig
  - Shenevelle Dickson
  - Ruchika Sharma
  - Muriel Cruz
  - Ana Suton
  - Priscilla Meirelles de Almeida
  - Kristiana Dimitrova
  - Tanya Beatriz Munizaga
  - Myriam Commelin
  - Erika Niklitschek Schmidt
  - Nicole Liu Xu (刘旭)
  - Maria Fernanda Navia
  - Karlota Calderon Brenes
  - Thea Frojkear
  - Nileny Dippton Estevez
  - Maria Luisa Barrios Landivar
  - Arwa Gouda
  - Silvia Gabriela Mejia Cordova
  - Jana Gruft
  - Ferehiyewot Abebe Merkuriya
  - Iida Laatu
  - Audrey Nogues
  - Maame Afua Akyeampong
  - Hannah McCuaig
  - Mirza Odette Garcia
  - Gabriela Zavala Irias
  - Jyoti Brahmin
  - Keren Somekh
  - Susan Kaittany
  - Hye-jin Cho
  - Lana Khattab
  - Natalija Grubovik
  - Eloise Law
  - Murielle Celimene
  - Valentina Cervera Avila
  - Anita Gurung
  - Saadia Himi
  - Rachael Tucker
  - Marifely Argüello César
  - Ufuoma Stacey Ejenobor
  - Brigitte Korsvik
  - Yanina Alicia González Jorgge
  - Liesel Holler Sotomayor
  - Tamera Marie Lagac Szijarto
  - Karolina Gorazda
  - Frederica Santos
  - Shanira Blanco
  - Katarina Hadzipavlovic
  - Nicole Sze Chin Nee
  - Sally Leung
  - Sara Jilena Lundemo
  - Simone Röthlisberger
  - Kahaya Luzasch (Stephanie Lesage)
  - Angel Wu
  - Sophia Byanaku
  - Radchadawan Khampeng
  - Leah Mari Guevara
  - Katherine Gonzalves Pedrozo
  - Stephanie Brownell
  -  Bùi Thúy Hạnh

Notes
Miss Earth 2004, Priscilla Meirelles also won the title "Miss Cyberpress Earth 2004" awarded by the website Globalbeauties.com after topping a survey participated in by webmasters in 19 pageant-related web portals.

Debuts

Returns

Last competed in 2001:
 
 
Last competed in 2002:

Did not compete
  – Ingrid Ivana González Caballero
  – Tatiana Rodina
  – Enid Solsiret Herrera Ramírez

Withdrawals

References

External links

 
 Miss Earth Foundation
 Miss Earth Foundation Kids' I Love My Planet

2004
2004 in the Philippines
2004 beauty pageants
Beauty pageants in the Philippines